Hendrik van Limborch (9 March 1681 – 3 February 1759) was a painter and engraver from the Northern Netherlands.

Limborch was born in The Hague as the son of a lawyer and became the pupil of Jan Hendrik Brandon, Robbert Duval, Jan de Baen and Adriaen van der Werff.

Limborch is known for portraits and historical allegories and died in The Hague.

Gallery

References 

 Hendrik van Limborch in the RKD

1681 births
1759 deaths
Artists from The Hague
18th-century Dutch painters
18th-century Dutch male artists
Dutch male painters